A sundowner is a northerly offshore wind in California along the southern Pacific slope of Santa Ynez Mountains, in communities along the Gaviota Coast and Santa Barbara towards but not including Ventura County.

Formation
It occurs when a region of high pressure is directly north of the area, the coast of which trends east–west. This contrasts with the more typical onshore flow. The winds blow with greatest force when the pressure gradient is perpendicular to the axis of the Santa Ynez Mountains, which rise directly behind Santa Barbara. 

These winds often precede Santa Ana events by a day or two, but also as tail end of Santa Anas after they weaken, it is normal for high-pressure areas to migrate east, causing the pressure gradients to shift to the northeast.  Aptly named sundowners are typically nighttime events that terminate after sunrise, they may repeat for days, while Santa Anas are multi-day long events. Weaker sundowner effects may occur without an associated Santa Ana event, at times due to a Diablo wind event (Northern California), akin to a foehn wind.

Fire dangers
Sundowners are particularly dangerous during wildfire season because the air heats and dries as it descends from the mountains to the sea. Gale force hot, dry winds can make firefighting impossible. A sundowner quickly burned a swath from the mountains through populated areas and across Highway 101 into Hope Ranch during the 1990 Painted Cave Fire. 

The most intense periods of the Jesusita Fire's destruction have also been blamed on sundowner winds. The Sherpa Fire grew to  overnight due to the sundowner winds, destroying the water system for El Capitán State Beach at the beginning of the 2016 fire season.

Origin
The etymology of the word sundowner is uncertain, but it may derive from the Spanish term zonda, or from the Arabic simoom, which are both similar wind phenomena. It is also typically the case that sundowner winds commence in the evening near sunset, when onshore sea breezes abate and offshore flows such as the sundowners pick up.

See also
List of local winds
Santa Barbara County Fire Department
Foehn wind

References

Winds
Climate of California
Natural history of Santa Barbara County, California
Santa Ynez Mountains
Santa Barbara, California
Weather events in the United States